Agatha Christie's Marple (or simply Marple) is a British ITV television programme loosely based on the books and short stories by British crime novelist Agatha Christie.  The title character was played by Geraldine McEwan from the first to the third series, until her retirement from the role, and by Julia McKenzie from the fourth series onwards. Unlike the counterpart TV series Agatha Christie's Poirot, the show took many liberties with Christie’s works, most notably adding Miss Marple’s character to the adaptations of novels in which she never appeared. Following the conclusion of the sixth series, the BBC acquired the rights for the production of Agatha Christie adaptations, suggesting that ITV would be unable to make a seventh series of Marple.

Overview
Each series consists of four feature-length episodes, except series six which only has three episodes. The first six episodes were all adaptations of Miss Marple novels by Christie. Subsequent episodes were derived both from works featuring Miss Marple and also Christie novels that did not feature the character.  The title of the series removes the word Miss from Miss Marple, to match the title of the Agatha Christie's Poirot series.

Plot outline

Agatha Christie's Marple follows the adventures of Miss Jane Marple, an elderly spinster living in the quiet little village of St. Mary Mead. During her many visits to friends and relatives in other villages (and sometimes when simply being at home), Miss Marple often stumbles upon or hears about mysterious murders, which she helps solve. Although the police are sometimes reluctant to accept Miss Marple's help, her reputation and unparalleled powers of observation eventually win them over.

During her adventures, Miss Marple is aided by close friends, relatives, or other allies that she meets, which include Tommy and Tuppence – protagonists of another series of Christie novels.

Recurring characters
The only character to appear in every episode is Miss Marple herself, played by Geraldine McEwan through series 3 and by Julia McKenzie from series 4 onwards.

A few other characters appear in more than one episode, although they are not always played by the same actor. Exceptions are Joanna Lumley, who plays Mrs Dolly Bantry in The Body in the Library and The Mirror Crack'd from Side to Side, and Stephen Churchett, who appears as the coroner in four episodes.

Dr Haydock appears in three episodes, but is played by three actors: Robin Soans in The Body in the Library, Robert Powell in The Murder at the Vicarage and Neil Stuke in The Mirror Crack'd from Side to Side. Jason Rafiel, an old friend of Marple's, was voiced by Herbert Lom (who also made an on-screen appearance as Mr Dufosse in The Murder at the Vicarage) in Nemesis and played by Antony Sher in A Caribbean Mystery.

The series also featured real-life characters: Winston Churchill appeared in The Sittaford Mystery, Noël Coward in 4.50 from Paddington, Louis Armstrong in At Bertram's Hotel, and Ian Fleming and James Bond in A Caribbean Mystery.

Adaptations and changes from novels
Christie's twelve novels featuring Miss Marple were all adapted for the series. The Murder at the Vicarage, The Body in the Library, 4.50 from Paddington, and A Murder is Announced in Series 1, Sleeping Murder and The Moving Finger in Series 2, At Bertram's Hotel and Nemesis in Series 3, A Pocket Full of Rye and They Do It with Mirrors in Series 4, The Mirror Crack'd from Side to Side in Series 5 and A Caribbean Mystery in Series 6.

In addition, several short stories featuring Miss Marple were adapted into full-length episodes across the series. The Blue Geranium in Series 5, elements of The Herb of Death were incorporated into the adaptation of The Secret of Chimneys in Series 5, while Greenshaw's Folly and The Thumb Mark of St. Peter were combined into one story for Series 6.

Across the twenty-three adaptations, many changes have been made from the source material.

The Body in the Library introduces a lesbian affair and changes the identity of one of the killers.
The Murder at the Vicarage removes or changes some minor characters and manufactures Miss Marple's early life.
4.50 from Paddington removes one character's death and simplifies the killer's motive.
A Murder Is Announced changes some of the characters and makes an implied lesbian relationship an explicit one.
Sleeping Murder changes the killer's motive, some characters backstory, inserts a central romantic relationship, and sideplot involving a travelling band of singers.
The Moving Finger changes the time period and some character backstory, but is largely faithful to the source material.
By the Pricking of My Thumbs inserts Miss Marple into what was originally a Tommy and Tuppence novel, and therefore changes many plot elements, including Tommy and Tuppence's relationship, adding characters, subplots, and changing the time period.
The Sittaford Mystery is very loosely based on the novel (which does not feature Miss Marple) and changes the identity of the killer. 
At Bertram's Hotel is only loosely based on the novel, changing many elements of the plot, characters and time period.
Ordeal by Innocence includes significant changes to the characters, adding Marple into the story.
Towards Zero inserts Miss Marple into the story and changes some characters, but is largely true to the original novel.
Nemesis is only loosely based on the novel, and changes characters and setting.
A Pocket Full of Rye is a faithful adaptation of the novel, with only minor changes to the way characters are described.
Murder Is Easy is very loosely based on the novel which does not feature Miss Marple, also changing the murderer's motive.
They Do It with Mirrors combines some characters and adds an arson attack.
Why Didn't They Ask Evans? is only loosely based on the novel, which does not feature Miss Marple, changing the plot and characters.
The Pale Horse is very loosely based on the novel which does not feature Miss Marple.
The Secret of Chimneys is very loosely based on the novel which does not feature Miss Marple, although it uses story elements from The Herb of Death. It also changes the killer's identity.
The Blue Geranium is greatly embellished from the original short story.
The Mirror Crack'd from Side to Side keeps closely to the original story.
A Caribbean Mystery keeps closely to the original story, apart from the inclusion of real-life novelist Ian Fleming and ornithologist James Bond. 
Greenshaw's Folly combines the short story with elements from The Thumb Mark of St. Peter. The story is embellished, but keeps to the core of the original works.
Endless Night is a faithful adaptation of the novel despite Miss Marple being added, but the story is very similar to The Case of The Caretaker.

Awards and nominations
Geraldine McEwan was nominated for a Satellite Award in 2005 for her role as Miss Marple in Series 1. The first series was also nominated for a Primetime Emmy Award in 2005.

Worldwide distribution
Agatha Christie's Marple is aired in the United States on PBS on Mystery!, where it is presented as Agatha Christie's "Miss Marple". The series is broadcast to the whole of Canada on CBC and in French on Radio-Canada. In Australia, Agatha Christie's Marple airs on ABC1.

Marple is also being broadcast on ATV World in Hong Kong, on EBS and MegaTV in South Korea and on CCTV-8 in China. China, however, refused to show The Body in the Library and Murder Is Easy, due to the involvement of a lesbian and an incestuous relationship respectively. Why Didn't They Ask Evans? was extensively edited, due to the involvement of War-period China.

In Norway, the series has been airing on state broadcaster NRK1 as "Miss Marple". In Sweden, Marple airs on TV4, the biggest commercial TV station. In Poland, the series airs on Ale Kino+. In the Czech Republic it is broadcast under the title Slečna Marplová, Czech for "Miss Marple".

In Brazil, the series airs on HBO Brasil. In the Netherlands it is broadcast on BBC First.

DVD releases
The first series of Marple was released in March 2005 in the UK, followed by the second series in July 2006. Series 1 was released in the US (Region 1) in May 2005, followed by the second series in August 2006.

The third series was released in October 2007 in the US, but its UK release was delayed because of ITV's decision to defer airing the final two installments. ITV released the third series on DVD in October 2008, before the broadcast of the final episode, Nemesis in January 2009.

Series 4 was released in the UK in January 2010, before the airing of Why Didn't They Ask Evans? in June 2011. The fourth series was released in Region 1 in August 2009, after the conclusion of the broadcast on PBS Mystery!

Series 5 episodes The Mirror Crack'd from Side to Side, The Secret of Chimneys and The Blue Geranium were released in the US (Region 1) in August 2010. The remaining episode of the fifth series, The Pale Horse, was released separately in June 2011, coinciding with its broadcast on PBS Mystery! that year. Series 5 was released in the UK (Region 2) in June 2011.
Series 1 to 5 were released in a 20 DVD box-set as "Agatha Christie's Marple – The Collection" in August 2011 in the UK.

Series 6 was released in the UK (Region 2) on 6 January 2014.
Series 1 to 6 were released in a 22 DVD box-set as "Marple: The Collection" on 13 January 2014.

Location
Marple was filmed in various locations, including London, the villages of Englefield in Berkshire, Chilham in Kent, Turville in Buckinghamshire and Blewbury in Oxfordshire. Windsor Guildhall in Windsor was featured as the fictional Melchester in Murder at the Vicarage. The interior of Highclere Castle was used in 4.50 From Paddington, Knebworth House was used in The Adventure of the Christmas Pudding, 4.50 From Paddington and Greenshaw's Folly. Hatfield House was used as Chimneys in The Secret of Chimneys. Hambleden was used as St. Mary Mead and Dorney Court featured in The Body in the Library as Gossington Hall, home of the Bantrys, and also as the vicarage in "The Moving Finger" Fawley Court in Buckinghamshire was used as Stoneygates in They Do It with Mirrors and The Grotto was used as the exterior of the secret folly in Endless Night. In Why Didn't They Ask Evans?, the Castle Savage scenes were largely filmed at Loseley Park near Guildford. A Caribbean Mystery was filmed in Cape Town, South Africa. The beach scenes were shot at Boulders Beach. Scenes were filmed in Dorchester for Endless Night. The exterior of Marina Gregg's house in The Mirror Crack'd from Side to Side were filmed at North Mymms Park. The cemetery in Nemesis was filmed at Waverley Abbey.

Ratings

Series 1

Series 2

Series 3

Series 4

Series 5

Series 6

References

External links

 Agatha Christie's Marple on SonyLIV

2000s British drama television series
2010s British drama television series
2004 British television series debuts
2013 British television series endings
ITV mystery shows
English-language television shows
ITV television dramas
Miss Marple
Period television series
Television shows based on works by Agatha Christie
Television series by ITV Studios
2000s British mystery television series
2010s British mystery television series
British detective television series